Prince Nicholas of Greece and Denmark (22 January 1872 – 8 February 1938), of the Glücksburg branch of the House of Oldenburg, was the fourth child and third son of King George I of Greece, and of Queen Olga. He was known as "Greek Nicky" within the family to distinguish him from his cousin Emperor Nicholas II of Russia (first cousin on the paternal side and second cousin on the maternal side). Prince Nicholas was a talented painter, often signing his works as "Nicolas Leprince."

Marriage and issue
He married Grand Duchess Elena Vladimirovna of Russia (1882–1957), daughter of Grand Duke Vladimir Alexandrovich of Russia and Marie of Mecklenburg-Schwerin, the only sister of the future Russian imperial pretender, Grand Duke Cyril Vladimirovich, and his second cousin through his mother Olga Constantinovna of Russia and her father Vladimir Alexandrovich of Russia, on 29 August 1902 in Tsarskoye Selo, Russia. 

They had three daughters:
 Princess Olga of Greece and Denmark (1903–1997); married Prince Paul of Yugoslavia.  Olga was the maternal grandmother of actress Catherine Oxenberg and author Christina Oxenberg.
 Princess Elizabeth of Greece and Denmark (1904–1955); married Count Carl Theodor of Toerring-Jettenbach.
 Princess Marina of Greece and Denmark (1906–1968); married Prince George, Duke of Kent.  Marina was the mother of Prince Edward, Duke of Kent, Princess Alexandra, the Honourable Lady Ogilvy, and Prince Michael of Kent.

The princesses were raised with an English nanny, Kate Fox, known as "Nurnie".

Public life
Along with his elder brothers Constantine and George, Nicholas helped to organize the 1896 Summer Olympics in Athens, the first to be held since 393. Nicholas served as president of the Sub-Committee for Shooting.

His father bequeathed him the Royal Theater of Greece which Nicholas, in turn, transferred to the Greek state in 1935.  He was friends with George Simitis and was godfather to his son, future socialist Prime Minister Kostas Simitis.

Death and burial
Prince Nicholas died in Athens on February 8, 1938 and was buried in the Royal tomb at the Palace of Tatoi.

Titles, styles, honours and arms

Titles and styles
22 January 1872 – 8 February 1938: His Royal Highness Prince Nicholas of Greece and Denmark.

Honours
 :
 R.E.: Knight of the Elephant, 7 September 1890
 D.M.: Cross of Honour of the Order of the Dannebrog, 29 October 1891
 Gb.E.T.: King Christian IX and Queen Louise of Denmark Golden Wedding Commemorative Medal
 M.M. 8 Apr.: King Christian IX Centenary Medal
 : 
Cross of Naval Merit, with White Decoration, 27 January 1892
Grand Cross of the Order of Charles III, with Collar, 15 May 1902
 : GCVO: Honorary Grand Cross of the Royal Victorian Order, 16 August 1901
 : Grand Cross of the Ludwig Order, 18 April 1904 
 : Knight of the Annunciation, 8 April 1907

Ancestry

References

External links
 

Greek princes
Danish princes
House of Glücksburg (Greece)
1872 births
1938 deaths
Burials at Tatoi Palace Royal Cemetery
Grand Crosses of Naval Merit
Honorary Knights Grand Cross of the Royal Victorian Order
Recipients of the Cross of Honour of the Order of the Dannebrog
Sons of kings